The 2022 World Shooting Para Sport Championships was the 8th edition of the World Shooting Para Sport Championships. It was held in Al Ain, United Arab Emirates from 6 to 17 November 2022. It was the first time the competition was staged in the Middle East.

World Shooting Para Sport has proposed that 31 athletes was eligible to participate in the 2024 Summer Paralympics based on their performance at Al Ain 2022 – increasing the overall importance of this tournament.

Medal summary

Medal table

References

External links
General Information

World Shooting Para Sport Championships
World Shooting Para Sport Championships
World Shooting Para Sport Championships
World Shooting Para Sport Championships
World Shooting Para Sport Championships